Act. 4 Cait Sith is the second single album by South Korean girl group Gugudan. It was released on February 1, 2018, by Jellyfish Entertainment and distributed by CJ E&M. This marks the last release to feature member Hyeyeon.

Background and release
On January 15, 2018, it was reported by Jellyfish Entertainment that Gugudan would make a return with nine members. In November 2017, member Soyee had gone on hiatus in order to fully recover from a shoulder injury that she had since prior to her debut. On January 18, the title of their second single album was revealed to be Act. 4 Cait Sith. From January 19–22, Gugudan shared an image teaser through their official SNS channels featuring the nine members wearing black dresses and another teaser image wearing white dresses. On January 24 at midnight KST, Gugudan released "Waltz A Cappella", a teaser video for the title track, "The Boots". The same day, they also released a dance teaser for "The Boots"  featuring member Hyeyeon. The title track, "The Boots", was released on January 31.

On January 25, Jellyfish Entertainment revealed that Gugudan's single album was pushed back, and would instead be released February 1. The next day, at midnight KST, the release schedule was revealed along with the track list which contained four songs.

Promotion
The group held comeback stages on February 1 on M Countdown, followed by performances on February 2–4 on Music Bank, Show! Music Core and Inkigayo, respectively.

Track listing

Charts

Release history

References

Gugudan albums
2018 albums